Ikumi Nishibori (Japanese: 西堀育実, born 20 August 1981) is a Japanese female volleyball player.

She played for the Japan women's national volleyball team, at the 2001 FIVB Women's World Grand Champions Cup.

On club level she played for the Pioneer Red Wings.

References

External links 
 
 

1981 births
Living people
Japanese women's volleyball players
Pioneer Red Wings players